Pezaptera sordida is a moth of the subfamily Arctiinae. It was described by Francis Walker in 1856. It is found in Tefé, Brazil.

References

Arctiinae
Moths described in 1856